is a Japanese novel series written by Baku Yumemakura.  An anime film adaptation directed by Mamoru Oshii is in production.

Publication
Baku Yumemakura originally published the series as 16 bunkobon volumes between 1982 and 2002, with cover illustrations by Yoshitaka Amano.  It was later rereleased as 8 tankōbon volumes between 2000 and 2002, again with covers by Yoshitaka Amano.  Both the bunkobon and tankōbon editions were published by Asahi Sonorama.  Asahi Shimbun Publications began publishing a new edition with covers by Katsuya Terada in 2008, and Kadokawa Shoten began publishing a separate edition, with covers by Shirow Miwa, in 2013.

Anime film adaptation
On March 5, 2018, Yumemakura's agency revealed via Twitter that Mamoru Oshii will adapt the novels for screen.  A note by Yumemakura in the 13th volume of the novels confirmed that the adaptation will be an anime film, although Oshii's role in the production was not specified.  Comic Natalie later reported that he would serve as director.

References

1982 Japanese novels
Films directed by Mamoru Oshii